Challenge of the Child Geniuses (subtitled Who is the Smartest Kid in America?, also known as Battle of the Child Geniuses in TV promos) was a series of two Fox television specials aired in May and November 2000. Dick Clark hosted both specials and Mark Thompson announced. Both specials were produced by Dick Clark Productions. This was the last game show that Clark hosted in his lifetime.

Format
40 or 50 child prodigies selected from a nationwide search competed for over $300,000 or $500,000 in cash and prizes.

The first round was a test of knowledge.  Host Clark asked the kids a series of multiple choice questions.  The kids had 10 seconds to lock in their answers on a keypad in front of them.  After 10 seconds, Clark revealed the correct answer and the home audience saw percentages of the kids who correctly answered the question and those who did not.

After this round, the kids' scores on this round and the pre-show test were combined, and the 16 kids with the highest combined scores advanced to the next round.  All others left with a personal handheld computer.

Rounds two through four were split into two heats, with each heat played during each of the two hours of the specials.

In round two, the 16 survivors from round one competed two at a time (eight in each hour) in a head-to-head test of knowledge.  Host Clark asked a question.  At any time the kids knew the correct answer, they could ring in.  If they correctly answered the question, they scored a point.  If they were not correct or failed to answer within two seconds after ringing in, their opponent scored the point.  First to score three points advanced to the next round.  The third point could not be earned by default; that is, if a player had two points and their opponent missed the question, then the other player would get to hear the entire question before answering.  The other player left with a digital camera in addition to the computer.

In round three, the eight survivors from round two competed as a group (four in each hour).  The kids were asked individual questions from categories randomly selected.  Correct answers still earned a point.  The first two challengers to reach three points advanced to the semifinals.  The others left with a big screen television in addition to the digital camera and the computer.

In the semifinal round, the four semifinalists (two in each hour) competed for the right to play in the finals.  The kids were asked different questions from seven categories, each one randomly selected.  A correct answer still earned a point.  An incorrect answer or no answer meant the opponent could steal the point by correctly answering that same question.  The first to reach five points advanced to the finals.  The other player left with a trip to Hawaii in addition to the big screen television, the digital camera and the computer.  The losing semifinalists also received a trust fund valued at $25,000.

In the finals, the two winners from each hour squared off against each other for the championship.  The kids were asked a series of questions posed by Clark.  The difference was that correct answers scored nothing.  The only way to score points was to correctly answer the question that their opponent missed.  Doing so earned one point.  The first to score five points off of opponents' missed questions won the top trust fund prize ($300,000 in the May special and $150,000 in the November special) in addition to the trip to Hawaii, the big screen television, the digital camera, the computer, and the title of "The Smartest Kid in America".  The other finalist received a trust fund ($100,000 in the May special and $75,000 in the November special) in addition to the trip to Hawaii, the big screen television, the digital camera and the computer.

International versions

Indian version 
India's Child Genius is an Indian game show based on the Fox format of the original American version. This show was hosted by Siddhartha Basu and broadcast on the Star World. The contest provided a platform for the brightest pre-teen academic achievers in the country, who were tested not just on general knowledge, but also on verbal and non-verbal reasoning, and subjects from their school curriculum that are aged 10–13. The special session of the show was filmed at the Rashtrapati Bhawan.

Italian version 
Genius - Il campionato dei piccoli geni was the Italian version of the game show aired to Rete 4 and presented by Mike Bongiorno and Alessandro Cecchi Paone in the pilot episode.

"The Smartest Kids in America"
 May 2000:  Michael Jezierny
 November 2000:  Andrew Turcich

References

2000 American television series debuts
2000 American television series endings
2000s American game shows
Fox Broadcasting Company original programming
Television series by 20th Century Fox Television
Television series by Dick Clark Productions